Hedin may refer to 

Hedin (surname)
Hedin (crater) on the Moon
Sven Hedin Glacier in Canada
A legendary figure in Nordic mythology, see Hedin and Högni
Hedin, a dwarf character from the Inheritance series by Christopher Paolini

See also
Heðin